Annie Grégorio (born 4 April 1957) is a French film and theatrical actress.

Theater

Filmography

References

External links

French film actresses
20th-century French actresses
21st-century French actresses
People from Nérac
Living people
1957 births